Gary Martin 'Marty' Gearheart (born September 15, 1961 in Zebulon, North Carolina) is an American politician and a Republican member of the West Virginia House of Delegates representing District 27 since January 12, 2013. Gearheart served consecutively from November 2, 2010 until January 2013 in the District 24 seat.

Education
Gearheart earned his BS in education from Concord University.

Elections
2012 Redistricted to District 27, Gearheart ran in the three-way May 8, 2012 Republican Primary and placed third by 65 votes with 1,516 votes (32.4%), and placed third in the six-way November 6, 2012 General election with 9,333 votes (18.8%) behind former Senator John Shott and Republican nominee Joe Ellington and ahead of Democratic nominees Ryan Flanigan, Greg Ball, and Bill Morefield, who had run for a District 25 seat in 2006 and 2010.
2010 To challenge incumbent Democratic United States Representative Nick Rahall in West Virginia's 3rd congressional district, Gearheart ran in the four-way Republican Primary but lost to Elliot Maynard, who lost the November 2, General election to Congressman Rahall.
2010 District 24 Republican Representative John Shott was unopposed for the May 11, 2010 Republican Primary, but was appointed to the West Virginia Senate to fill a vacancy; Gearheart replaced him on the ballot for the November 2, 2010 General election, and won unopposed with 2,797 votes.

References

External links
Official page at the West Virginia Legislature
Campaign site

Marty Gearheart at Ballotpedia
Marty Gearheart at OpenSecrets

1961 births
Living people
Concord University alumni
Republican Party members of the West Virginia House of Delegates
People from Bluefield, West Virginia
People from Zebulon, North Carolina
21st-century American politicians